The 2018 Big Ten conference football season was the 123rd season of college football play for the Big Ten Conference and was part of the 2018 NCAA Division I FBS football season.

This was the Big Ten's fifth season with 14 teams. The defending league champion was Ohio State. The 2018 season consisted of a nine–game conference schedule for the third year in a row.

The Big Ten had one new coach for the 2018 season, with Nebraska hiring alumnus Scott Frost. Frost came to Nebraska after having coached UCF to an undefeated 13–0 season in 2017.

Ohio State head coach Urban Meyer was suspended for the first three games of the 2018 season by Ohio State for the mishandling of a situation involving domestic abuse charges against former assistant coach Zach Smith. Ohio State offensive coordinator Ryan Day served as acting head coach for the first three games of the 2018 season.

Maryland head coach D.J. Durkin was placed on administrative leave on August 11, 2018 due to the death of a player on his team, Jordan McNair, during summer workouts. On October 30, the school reinstated Durkin to his role as head coach, and was set to rejoin the team in Week #10. However, after a lot of negative reaction, a day later the University of Maryland decided to fire DJ Durkin.

Ohio State and Michigan shared the East Division title, but Ohio State advances to the championship game by virtue of its head-to-head win in the regular season finale. Northwestern clinched the West Division title on November 10. The Buckeyes went on to defeat the Wildcats in the conference championship game in Indianapolis by a score of 45-24 to win their second consecutive Big Ten championship and 37th conference crown in program history.

Nine Big Ten programs advanced to bowl games, with Ohio State and Michigan earning New Year's Six bowl bids in the Rose and Peach Bowls, respectively.

On December 4, 2018, Ohio State announced that head coach Urban Meyer would be stepping down following the Buckeyes' appearance in the Rose Bowl and that offensive coordinator Ryan Day, who served as interim head coach for the first three games of the season, would become the next head coach at Ohio State.

Previous season
Ohio State defeated Wisconsin, 27–21, in the Big Ten Football Championship Game.

Eight teams participated in bowl games in the 2017 season and the league went a very impressive 7–1 in those games, however the Big Ten failed to land a team in the 2017 College Football Playoff. Iowa defeated Boston College, 27-20, in the Pinstripe Bowl. Purdue won, 38–35, over Arizona in the Foster Farms Bowl. Michigan State defeated Washington State, 42–17, in the Holiday Bowl. Northwestern defeated Kentucky, 24–23, at the Music City Bowl. Ohio State defeated USC, 24–7, in the Cotton Bowl. Wisconsin defeated Miami (FL), 34–24, in the Orange Bowl. Penn State defeated Washington by a score of 35–28 in the Fiesta Bowl. Michigan lost to South Carolina, 26–19, in the Outback Bowl.

Preseason
2018 Big Ten Spring Football and number of signees on signing day:

Recruiting classes

Big Ten Media Days
The Big Ten conducted its annual media days at the Chicago Marriott Downtown Chicago Magnificent Mile in Chicago, IL on July 23–24. The event commenced with a speech by Big Ten commissioner Jim Delany, and all 14 teams sent their head coaches and two selected players to speak with members of the media. The event along with all speakers and interviews were broadcast live on the Big Ten Network. The teams and representatives in respective order were as follows:

Preseason media polls
The Big Ten Media Days concluded with its annual preseason media polls in early August. Since 1992, the credentialed media has gotten the preseason champion correct just five times. Only eight times has the preseason pick even made it to the Big Ten title game. Below are the results of the media poll with total points received next to each school and first-place votes in parentheses.

Big Ten Champion Voting
Ohio State def. Wisconsin - 14
Wisconsin def. Ohio State - 9
Wisconsin def. Michigan - 2
Wisconsin def. Penn State - 1
Wisconsin def. Michigan State - 1
Michigan State def. Wisconsin - 1

 
East Division
1. Ohio State (23.5) - 191.5 pts
2. Michigan State (2) - 142
3. Penn State (1) - 141.5
4. Michigan (1.5) - 140.5
5. Maryland - 75.5
6. Indiana - 60
7. Rutgers - 33

West Division
1. Wisconsin (28) - 196 pts
2. Iowa - 155
3. Northwestern - 138
4. Nebraska - 104
5. Purdue - 98.5
6. Minnesota - 64.5
7. Illinois - 28

Rankings

Schedule

All times Eastern time.

† denotes Homecoming game

Regular season

Week one

Week two

Week three

Week four

Week five

Week six

Week seven

Week eight

Week nine

Nebraska adds Bethune-Cookman to 2018 schedule in place of previously scheduled bye week to make up for Akron game that was canceled in Week 1 due to weather.

Week ten

Week eleven

Week twelve

Week thirteen

 Championship game 
 Week 14 (Big Ten Championship Game) 

Bowl games

Rankings are from AP Poll.  All times Eastern Time Zone.

Big Ten records vs Other Conferences
2018–2019 records against non-conference foes:(Through games of January 1, 2019) 

Regular Season

Postseason

Awards and honors

Player of the week honors

Big Ten Individual Awards

The following individuals won the conference's annual player and coach awards:

All-Conference Teams

2018 Big Ten All-Conference Teams and Awards

Coaches Honorable Mention: ILLINOIS: Nick Allegretti, Blake Hayes; INDIANA: Marcelino Ball, Jonathan Crawford, Donovan Hale, J-Shun Harris II, Brandon Knight, Wes Martin, Stevie Scott; IOWA: Jake Gervase, Matt Nelson, Miguel Recinos, Keegan Render, Tristan Wirfs; MARYLAND: Byron Cowart, Tino Ellis, Derwin Gray, Ty Johnson, Wade Lees, Brendan Moore, Joseph Petrino; MICHIGAN: Juwann Bushell-Beatty, Nico Collins, Bryan Mone, Josh Ross, Josh Uche, Khaleke Hudson, Tyree Kinnel; MICHIGAN STATE: Felton Davis III, Andrew Dowell, Khari Willis, Mike Panasiuk; MINNESOTA: Emmit Carpenter, Donnell Greene, Jacob Huff, Jacob Herbers; NEBRASKA: Isaac Armstrong, Mohamed Barry, Carlos Davis, Luke Gifford, Brenden Jaimes, Adrian Martinez, Devine Ozigbo; NORTHWESTERN: Blake Gallagher, Cameron Green, Flynn Nagel, J.R. Pace, Nate Hall, Clayton Thorson; OHIO STATE: Damon Arnette, Tuf Borland, Jonathon Cooper, Jordan Fuller, Malik Harrison, K. J. Hill, Demetrius Knox, Robert Landers, Thayer Munford, Jeffrey Okudah, Malcolm Pridgeon, Kendall Sheffield, Mike Weber; PENN STATE: Pat Freiermuth, Steven Gonzalez, K. J. Hamler, Garrett Taylor, John Reid, Robert Windsor; PURDUE: Derrick Barnes, Kirk Barron, Antonio Blackmon, David Blough, Spencer Evans, Brycen Hopkins, D.J. Knox, Matt McCann, Jacob Thineneman; RUTGERS: Rahmeem Blackshear, Justin Davidovicz, Saquan Hampton, Jonah Jackson, Adam Korsack; WISCONSIN: Jake Ferguson, Rafael Gaglianone.

Media Honorable Mention: ILLINOIS: Del'Shawn Phillips, Alex Palczewski, Bobby Roundtree; INDIANA: Marcelino Ball, Jonathan Crawford, J-Shun Harris II, Brandon Knight, Wes Martin, Stevie Scott; IOWA: Jake Gervase, Parker Hesse, Matt Nelson, Miguel Recinos, Ihmir Smith-Marsette, Geno Stone, Tristan Wirfs; MARYLAND: Antoine Brooks, Byron Cowart, Tino Ellis, Derwin Gray, Ty Johnson, Wade Lees, Brendan Moore, Joseph Petrino; MICHIGAN: Juwann Bushell-Beatty, Zach Gentry, Khaleke Hudson, Tyree Kinnel, Sean McKeon, Michael Onwenu, Shea Patterson, Kwity Paye, Donovan Peoples-Jones, Cesar Ruiz, Josh Uche; MICHIGAN STATE: Felton Davis III, Andrew Dowell, David Dowell, Connor Heyward, Mike Panasiuk; MINNESOTA: Blaise Andries, Emmit Carpenter, Demetrius Douglas, Daniel Faalele, Donnell Greene, Jacob Herbers, Jacob Huff, Mohamed Ibrahim, Conner Olson, Jared Weyler; NEBRASKA: Isaac Armstrong, Khalil Davis, Luke Gifford, Brenden Jaimes, Adrian Martinez, Boe Wilson; NORTHWESTERN: Cameron Green, Nate Hall, Flynn Nagel, J.R. Pace, Rashawn Slater, Clayton Thorson; OHIO STATE: Damon Arnette, Tuf Borland, Nick Bosa, Jonathon Cooper, J. K. Dobbins, Malik Harrison, Terry McLaurin, Thayer Munford, Malcolm Pridgeon, Kendall Sheffield, Pete Werner; PENN STATE: Pat Freiermuth, Steven Gonzalez, K. J. Hamler, Micah Parsons, John Reid, Nick Scott, Garrett Taylor, Robert Windsor; PURDUE: Kirk Barron, Antonio Blackmon, Spencer Evans, Kenneth Major, Matt McCann, Lorenzo Neal, Joe Schopper, Jacob Thineneman, Isaac Zico; RUTGERS: Saquan Hampton, Jonah Jackson, Adam Korsack, Trevor Morris; WISCONSIN: Ryan Connelly, Jake Ferguson, Andrew Van Ginkel.

All-Americans

The 2018 College Football All-America Team is composed of the following College Football All-American first teams chosen by the following selector organizations: Associated Press (AP), Football Writers Association of America (FWAA), American Football Coaches Association (AFCA), Walter Camp Foundation (WCFF), The Sporting News (TSN), Sports Illustrated (SI), USA Today (USAT) ESPN, CBS Sports (CBS), FOX Sports (FOX) College Football News (CFN), Bleacher Report (BR), Scout.com, Phil Steele (PS), SB Nation (SB), Athlon Sports, Pro Football Focus (PFF) and Yahoo! Sports (Yahoo!).

Currently, the NCAA compiles consensus all-America teams in the sports of Division I-FBS football and Division I men's basketball using a point system computed from All-America teams named by coaches associations or media sources.  The system consists of three points for a first-team honor, two points for second-team honor, and one point for third-team honor.  Honorable mention and fourth team or lower recognitions are not accorded any points.  Football consensus teams are compiled by position and the player accumulating the most points at each position is named first team consensus all-American.  Currently, the NCAA recognizes All-Americans selected by the AP, AFCA, FWAA, TSN, and the WCFF to determine Consensus and Unanimous All-Americans. Any player named to the First Team by all five of the NCAA-recognized selectors is deemed a Unanimous All-American.2018 Consensus All-America Team

*AFCA All-America Team (AFCA)
*Walter Camp Football Foundation All-America Team (WCFF)
*Associated Press All-America Team (AP)
*The Sporting News All-America Team (TSN)
*Football Writers Association of America All-America Team (FWAA)
*Sports Illustrated All-America Team (SI)
*Bleacher Report All-America Team (BR)
*College Football News All-America Team (CFN)
*ESPN All-America Team (ESPN)
*CBS Sports All-America Team (CBS)
*Athlon Sports All-America Team (Athlon)

National award winners2018 College Football Award WinnersDoak Walker Award (Nation's Top Running Back)
Jonathan Taylor, Wisconsin

John Mackey Award (Outstanding Tight End)
T. J. Hockenson, Iowa

Paul Hornung Award (Most Versatile Player)
Rondale Moore, Purdue

Academic All-Americans

2018 CoSIDA Academic-All Americans

Home Attendance

Bold – Exceed capacity
†Season High
‡Played at Soldier Field

2019 NFL Draft

Notes

Head coachesCurrent through games of January 1, 2019* Tom Allen was hired to replace Kevin Wilson in December 2016 at Indiana and coached the Hoosiers in their 2016 bowl game.* Matt Canada was named interim coach at Maryland after D.J. Durkin was placed on administrative leave by the school. D.J. Durkin was reinstated as head coach at Maryland on October 30, 2018, in time for Maryland's ninth game of the season. A day after his reinstatement, after much negative reaction from multiple stakeholders, Maryland ultimately decided to fire D.J. Durkin.* Urban Meyer was suspended by Ohio State University for the first three games of the 2018 season due to the mishandling of domestic abuse allegations against one of his former assistant coaches. Ryan Day was named interim head coach in Meyer's absence.''

References